Figularia is a genus of bryozoans belonging to the family Cribrilinidae.

The genus has almost cosmopolitan distribution.

Species:

Figularia arnouldi 
Figularia bragai 
Figularia capitifera 
Figularia carinata 
Figularia clithridiata 
Figularia contraria 
Figularia crassicostulata 
Figularia dimorpha 
Figularia duvergieri 
Figularia echinoides 
Figularia elcanoi 
Figularia figularis 
Figularia fissa 
Figularia fissurata 
Figularia haueri 
Figularia hilli 
Figularia huttoni 
Figularia japonica 
Figularia kenleyi 
Figularia mernae 
Figularia ortmanni 
Figularia pelmatifera 
Figularia peltata 
Figularia philomela 
Figularia planicostulata 
Figularia quaylei 
Figularia rhodanica 
Figularia rugosa 
Figularia ryukuensis 
Figularia speciosa 
Figularia spectabilis 
Figularia spinea 
Figularia tenuicosta 
Figularia triangula

References

Bryozoan genera